Stéphane Dedebant (born 17 October 1970) is a retired French football midfielder. Following a career in France, he trialled with Hearts in 2001 before retiring.

References

1970 births
Living people
French footballers
Racing Club de France Football players
Stade Malherbe Caen players
LB Châteauroux players
FC Sochaux-Montbéliard players
Association football midfielders
Ligue 1 players
Ligue 2 players